Azerbaijanis in Belarus are a small Azerbaijani diaspora in Belarus, and are Belarusian citizens and permanent residents of ethnic Azerbaijani background. Azerbaijan and Belarus took through centuries and both countries used to be the part of Russian Empire and then Soviet Union. Currently there are over 5,567 (0.1%) Azerbaijanis in Belarus. One of the most well-known TV hosts in Belarus, Leila Ismailava, is also an Azerbaijani.

Demographics

Notable people
 Gunesh Abasova, Belarusian singer
 Natik Bagirov, Belarusian judoka
 Leila Ismailava, Belarusian journalist leading music TV programs; model
 Kamandar Madzhidov, Belarusian wrestler, 1988 Olympic gold medal winner
 Rashad Mammadov, Belarusian judoka
 Zabit Samedov, Belarusian kickboxer

See also
Azerbaijan–Belarus relations
Demographics of Belarus

References

Ethnic groups in Belarus
Azerbaijani diaspora in Europe
Belarusian people of Azerbaijani descent
Muslim communities in Europe